Söderhamn  is a locality and the seat of Söderhamn Municipality, Gävleborg County, Sweden with 11,761 inhabitants in 2010.

Sports
The biggest local sport is bandy. Broberg/Söderhamn Bandy play in the highest division Elitserien and have become Swedish champions five times. In October 2017 the indoor venue Helsingehus Arena was inaugurated. The coach of the national bandy team and members of the Federation of International Bandy board, such as the current Secretary General Bo Nyman, have come from Söderhamn.

Söderhamns FF and Stugsunds IK are the local football clubs.

Notable residents
Safin Taki, film producer, director and cinematographer who grew up in Söderhamn.
Jan Johansson, jazz musician and pianist who was born in Söderhamn.

Gallery

References

External links 

 

 
Municipal seats of Gävleborg County
Coastal cities and towns in Sweden
Swedish municipal seats
Populated places in Söderhamn Municipality
Hälsingland